Cathal Gurrin is an Irish lifelogger. He is the deputy head of the School of Computing, at Dublin City University, a Funded Investigator of the Insight Centre, and the director of the Human Media Archives research group.

His interests include personal analytics and lifelogging. He publishes in information retrieval (IR) with a particular focus on how people access information from mobile devices (MHCIR). He has captured a continuous personal digital memory since 2006 using a camera mounted on his chest and logged hundreds of millions of other sensor readings.


Early life 
Cathal attended primary school in Scoil Lorcáin, Kilbarrack, Dublin, and secondary school in St. Fintan's High School, Sutton. He graduated from Dublin City University in 2002 with a PhD in developing web search engines, including the first Irish language search engine.

Research 
Gurrin has worn a chest-mounted camera (a Microsoft SenseCam) since 2006 which takes several still photographs every minute. He also records his location (using GPS) and accelerometer data with each image. Gurrin generated a database of over 16 million images, and produces about a terabyte of personal data a year. Gurrin and his researchers use information retrieval algorithms to segment his personal image archive into "events" such as eating, driving, etc. New events are recognised on a daily basis using machine learning. In an interview Gurrin said that "If I need to remember where I left my keys, or where I parked my car, or what wine I drank at an event two years ago... the answers should all be there." While searching by date and time is easy, more complex searches within images such as looking for brand names and objects with complex form factors, such as keys, is more difficult. One aim of Gurrin's research is to create various forms of search engine to allow complex searches of such image databases, and to develop new forms of assistive technology.  He is the founder of the annual ACM Lifelog Search Challenge, which attracts a worldwide participant list annually.

References

External links 
 Adapt Centre

1975 births
St Fintan's High School
Alumni of Dublin City University
Living people
People educated at St. Fintan's High School